Ravenwood Plantation is a historic rice plantation, built in 1850 near Neyles in Colleton County, South Carolina.

It was listed on the National Register of Historic Places in 1997.

References

Anti-black racism in the United States
Houses on the National Register of Historic Places in South Carolina
History of South Carolina
Plantations in South Carolina
Houses in Colleton County, South Carolina
National Register of Historic Places in Colleton County, South Carolina